The 1913 Montana A&M football team was an American football team that represented the Montana College of Agriculture and Mechanic Arts (later renamed Montana State University) during the 1913 college football season. In its first and only season under head coach Eugene F. Bunker, the team compiled a 2–2 record and outscored opponents by a total of 45 to 33. Edward Noble was the team captain.

Schedule

References

Montana AandM
Montana State Bobcats football seasons
Montana AandM football